Inge Limberg (17 December 1922 – 22 May 1989) was a Swedish cross-country skier. He competed in the 50 km event at the 1956 Winter Olympics.

Cross-country skiing results

Olympic Games

References

External links
 

1922 births
1989 deaths
Swedish male cross-country skiers
Olympic cross-country skiers of Sweden
Cross-country skiers at the 1956 Winter Olympics
People from Dalarna